Almuñécar International School is a private international Primary and Secondary school on the Costa Tropical in Granada province, Spain. The school is a member of the National Association of British Schools in Spain (NABSS). The school  serves a wide catchment area including Torrox, Nerja, Motril and Granada. 
The school was founded in 1989 and is owned by a conglomerate of parents. 

Education at the school is grounded on the National Curriculum, Spanish education requirements.

School Address:

Calle Pinariego, 1, 
18690, Almunecar,
Granada,
Spain.

http://www.almunecarinternationalschool.org/

See also

 Instituto Español Vicente Cañada Blanch - Spanish international school in London
 British migration to Spain

References

International schools in Spain
Almuñécar
Educational institutions established in 1989
1989 establishments in Spain